Willem Frederik Andries de Beer (born 14 March 1988) is a South African sprinter who specializes in the 400 metres.

He won a silver medal in the 4 × 400 m relay at the 2011 World Championships in Athletics in Daegu.

At the 2012 Summer Olympics, de Beer was part of the South African team in the 4 x 400 metres relay semifinal, where he was to run the final leg. In the second leg Ofentse Mogawane collided with Kenya's Vincent Mumo Kiilu, resulting in South Africa's withdrawal from the race. South Africa was passed into the final on appeal to the IAAF, due to interference from the Kenyan athlete who downed Mogawane. They were assigned the 9th lane. He ran the second leg in the final in which South Africa finished eighth.

References

External links

1988 births
Living people
Sportspeople from Pretoria
South African male sprinters
Athletes (track and field) at the 2012 Summer Olympics
Olympic athletes of South Africa
World Athletics Championships medalists
Universiade medalists in athletics (track and field)
Universiade bronze medalists for South Africa
Medalists at the 2011 Summer Universiade